Seefin is a mountain near the southern border of County Limerick, Ireland. At 528m (1,732 ft) it is the highest point and the second most northerly summit in the Ballyhoura Mountains and the 396th highest in Ireland. Latitude: 52.313847 Longitude: -8.522738.

Name
The name Suí Finn translates as the Seat of Fionn (Mac Cumhaill). It is so named because, according to tradition, Fionn mac Cumhaill and the Fianna stopped here in their travels around the country.

References

External links
 Listing at peakbagger.com

Marilyns of Ireland
Mountains and hills of County Limerick